The bull shark (Carcharhinus leucas), also known as the Zambezi shark (informally zambi) in Africa and Lake Nicaragua shark in Nicaragua, is a species of requiem shark commonly found worldwide in warm, shallow waters along coasts and in rivers. It is known for its aggressive nature, and presence mainly in warm, shallow brackish and freshwater systems including estuaries and (usually) lower reaches of rivers.

Bull sharks are euryhaline and can thrive in both salt and fresh water. Larger-sized bull sharks are probably responsible for the majority of nearshore shark attacks, including many incidents of shark bites attributed to other species.

Unlike the river sharks of the genus Glyphis, bull sharks are not true freshwater sharks, despite their ability to survive in freshwater habitats.

Etymology
The name "bull shark" comes from the shark's stocky shape, broad, flat snout, and aggressive, unpredictable behavior. In India, the bull shark may be confused with the Sundarbans or Ganges shark. In Africa, it is also commonly called the Zambezi River shark, or just "zambi".

Its wide range and diverse habitats result in many other local names, including Ganges River shark, Fitzroy Creek whaler, van Rooyen's shark, Lake Nicaragua shark, river shark, freshwater whaler, estuary whaler, Swan River whaler, cub shark, and shovelnose shark.

Evolution 
Some of the bull shark's closest living relatives do not have the capabilities of osmoregulation. Its genus, Carcharhinus, also includes the sandbar shark, which is not capable of osmoregulation.

The bull shark shares numerous similarities with river sharks of the genus Glyphis, and other species in the genus Carcharhinus, but its phylogeny has not been cleared yet.

Anatomy and appearance
Bull sharks are large and stout, with females being larger than males. Bull sharks are wider and heavier than other requiem sharks of comparable length, and are grey on top and white below. The second dorsal fin is smaller than the first. The bull shark's caudal fin is longer and lower than that of the larger sharks, and it has a small snout, and lacks an interdorsal ridge.

Exceptional specimens

Distribution and habitat
The bull shark is commonly found worldwide in coastal areas of warm oceans, in rivers and lakes, and occasionally salt and freshwater streams if they are deep enough. In the Atlantic, it is found from Massachusetts to southern Brazil, and from Morocco to Angola.

Populations of bull sharks are also found in several major rivers, with more than 500 bull sharks thought to be living in the Brisbane River. One was reportedly seen swimming the flooded streets of Brisbane, Queensland, Australia, during the 2010–11 Queensland floods. Several were sighted in one of the main streets of Goodna, Queensland, shortly after the peak of the January 2011, floods. A large bull shark was caught in the canals of Scarborough, just north of Brisbane within Moreton Bay. Still greater numbers are in the canals of the Gold Coast, Queensland. In the Pacific Ocean, it can be found from Baja California to Ecuador.

The bull shark has traveled  up the Amazon River to Iquitos in Peru and north Bolivia. It also lives in freshwater Lake Nicaragua, in the Ganges and Brahmaputra Rivers of West Bengal, and Assam in Eastern India and adjoining Bangladesh. It can live in water with a high salt content as in St. Lucia Estuary in South Africa. Bull sharks have been recorded in the Tigris River since at least 1924 as far upriver as Baghdad. The species has a distinct preference for warm currents.

After Hurricane Katrina, many bull sharks were sighted in Lake Pontchartrain. Bull sharks have occasionally gone as far upstream in the Mississippi River as Alton, Illinois. Bull sharks have also been found in the Potomac River in Maryland. A golf course lake at Carbook, Logan City, Queensland, Australia is the home to several bull sharks. They were trapped following a flood of the Logan and Albert Rivers in 1996. The golf course has capitalized on the novelty and now hosts a monthly tournament called the "Shark Lake Challenge".

Behavior

Freshwater tolerance
The bull shark is the best known of 43 species of elasmobranch in 10 genera and four families to have been reported in fresh water. Other species that enter rivers include the stingrays (Dasyatidae, Potamotrygonidae and others) and sawfish (Pristidae). Some skates (Rajidae), smooth dogfishes (Triakidae), and sandbar sharks (Carcharhinus plumbeus) regularly enter estuaries.

The bull shark is diadromous, meaning they can swim between salt and fresh water with ease. These fish also are euryhaline fish, able to adapt to a wide range of salinities. The bull shark is one of the few cartilaginous fishes that have been reported in freshwater systems. Many of the euryhaline fish are bony fish such as salmon and tilapia and are not closely related to bull sharks. Evolutionary assumptions can be made to help explain this sort of evolutionary disconnect, one being that the bull shark encountered a population bottleneck that occurred during the last ice age. This bottleneck may have separated the bull shark from the rest of the Elasmobranchii subclass and favored the genes for an osmoregulatory system.

Elasmobranchs' ability to enter fresh water is limited because their blood is normally at least as salty (in terms of osmotic strength) as seawater through the accumulation of urea and trimethylamine oxide, but bull sharks living in fresh water show a significantly reduced concentration of urea within their blood. Despite this, the solute composition (i.e. osmolarity) of a bull shark in fresh water is still much higher than that of the external environment. This results in a large influx of water across the gills due to osmosis and loss of sodium and chloride from the shark's body. However, bull sharks in fresh water possess several organs with which to maintain appropriate salt and water balance; these are the rectal gland, kidneys, liver, and gills. All elasmobranchs have a rectal gland which functions in the excretion of excess salts accumulated as a consequence of living in seawater. Bull sharks in freshwater environments decrease the salt-excretory activity of the rectal gland, thereby conserving sodium and chloride. The kidneys produce large amounts of dilute urine, but also play an important role in the active reabsorption of solutes into the blood. The gills of bull sharks are likely to be involved in the uptake of sodium and chloride from the surrounding fresh water, whereas urea is produced in the liver as required with changes in environmental salinity. Recent work also shows that the differences in density of fresh water to that of marine waters result in significantly greater negative buoyancies in sharks occupying fresh water, resulting in increasing costs of living in fresh water. Bull sharks caught in freshwater have subsequently been shown to have lower liver densities than sharks living in marine waters. This may reduce the added cost of greater negative buoyancy.

Bull sharks are able to regulate themselves to live in either fresh or salt water. It can live in fresh water for its entire life, but this does not happen, mostly due to the reproductive needs of the shark. Young bull sharks leave the brackish water in which they are born and move out into the sea to breed. Whilst it is theoretically possible for bull sharks to live purely in fresh water, experiments conducted on bull sharks found that they died within four years. The stomach was opened and all that was found were two small, unidentifiable fishes. The cause of death could have been starvation since the primary food source for bull sharks resides in salt water.

In a research experiment, the bull sharks were found to be at the mouth of an estuary for the majority of the time. They stayed at the mouth of the river independent of the salinity of the water. The driving factor for a bull shark to be in fresh or salt water, however, is its age; as the bull shark ages, its tolerance for very low or high salinity increases. The majority of the newborn or very young bull sharks were found in the freshwater area, whereas the much older bull sharks were found to be in the saltwater areas, as they had developed a much better tolerance for the salinity. Reproduction is one of the reasons why adult bull sharks travel into the river—it is thought to be a physiological strategy to improve juvenile survival and a way to increase overall fitness of bull sharks. The young are not born with a high tolerance for high salinity, so they are born in fresh water and stay there until they are able to travel out.

Initially, scientists thought the sharks in Lake Nicaragua belonged to an endemic species, the Lake Nicaragua shark (Carcharhinus nicaraguensis). In 1961, following specimen comparisons, taxonomists synonymized them. Bull sharks tagged inside the lake have later been caught in the open ocean (and vice versa), with some taking as few as seven to 11 days to complete the journey.

Diet
The bull shark's diet consists mainly of bony fish and small sharks, including other bull sharks, and stingrays. Their diet can also include turtles, birds, dolphins, terrestrial mammals, crustaceans, and echinoderms. They hunt in murky waters where it is harder for the prey to see the shark coming. Bull sharks have been known to use the bump-and-bite technique to attack their prey. After the first initial contact, they continue to bite and tackle prey until the prey is unable to flee.

The bull shark is a solitary hunter, though may briefly pair with another bull shark to make hunting and tricking prey easier.

Sharks are opportunistic feeders, and the bull shark is no exception to this, as it is part of the Carcharhinus family of sharks. Normally, sharks eat in short bursts, and when food is scarce, sharks digest for a much longer period of time in order to avoid starvation. As part of their survival mechanism, bull sharks will regurgitate the food in their stomachs in order to escape from a predator. This is a distraction tactic; if the predator moves to eat the regurgitated food the bull shark can use the opportunity to escape.

Reproduction
Bull sharks mate during late summer and early autumn, often in bays and estuaries. After gestating for 12 months, a bull shark may give birth to 1 to 13 live young.

They are viviparous, born live and free-swimming. The bull shark does not rear its young; the young bull sharks are born into flat, protected areas. Coastal lagoons, river mouths, and other low-salinity estuaries are common nursery habitats.

The male bull shark is able to begin reproducing around the age of 15 years while the female cannot begin reproducing until the age of 18 years. The size of a fully matured female bull shark to produce viable eggs for fertilization seems to be 175 cm to 235 cm. The courting routine between bull sharks has not been observed in detail as of yet. The male likely bites the female on the tail until she can turn upside down and the male can copulate at that point. Mature females commonly have scratches from the mating process.

Interactions with humans

Since bull sharks often dwell in very shallow waters, are found in many types of habitats, are territorial by nature, and have no tolerance for provocation, they may be more dangerous to humans than any other species of shark. Bull sharks are one of the three shark species (along with the tiger shark and great white shark) most likely to bite humans.

One or several bull sharks may have been responsible for the Jersey Shore shark attacks of 1916, which were the inspiration for Peter Benchley's novel Jaws. The speculation that bull sharks may have been responsible is based on two fatal bites occurring in brackish and fresh water.

Bull sharks have attacked swimmers around the Sydney Harbour inlets. In India, bull sharks swim up the Ganges, Bramaputra, Mahanadi, and other Indian rivers and have bitten bathers. Many of these bite incidents were attributed to the Ganges shark, Glyphis gangeticus, a critically endangered river shark species, although the sand tiger shark was also blamed during the 1960s and 1970s.

Bull sharks have also attacked humans off the coast of Florida.

Visual cues
Behavioral studies have confirmed that sharks can take visual cues to discriminate between different objects. The bull shark is able to discriminate between colors of mesh netting that is present underwater. It was found that bull sharks tended to avoid mesh netting of bright colors rather than colors that blended in with the water. Bright yellow mesh netting was found to be easily avoided when it was placed in the path of the bull shark. This was found to be the reason that sharks are attracted to bright yellow survival gear rather than ones that were painted black.

Energy conservation
In 2008, researchers tagged and recorded the movements of young bull sharks in the Caloosahatchee River estuary. They were testing to find out what determined the movement of the young bull sharks. It was found that the young bull sharks synchronously moved downriver when the environmental conditions changed. This large movement of young bull sharks were found to be moving as a response rather than other external factors such as predators. The movement was found to be directly related to the bull shark conserving energy for itself. One way the bull shark is able to conserve energy is that when the tidal flow changes, the bull shark uses the tidal flow in order to conserve energy as it moves downriver. Another way for the bull shark to conserve energy is to decrease the amount of energy needed to osmoregulate the surrounding environment.

Ecology
Humans are the biggest threat to bull sharks. Larger sharks, such as the tiger shark and great white shark, may attack them, but typically only target juveniles. Crocodiles may be a threat to bull sharks in rivers. Saltwater crocodiles have been observed preying on bull sharks in the rivers and estuaries of Northern Australia, and a Nile crocodile was reportedly sighted consuming a bull shark in South Africa.

See also

 Outline of sharks
 List of sharks
 List of fatal, unprovoked shark attacks in the United States by decade

References

Sources

 
 
 
 Sunday Herald Sun, Sunday, 23 April 2005

External links

 
  (5 min 23 second video with audio)
 

bull shark
Viviparous fish
Pantropical fish
Lake Nicaragua
bull shark
Fish of Nicaragua
bull shark
bull shark
Articles containing video clips
Apex predators